Job (born André Jobin on 25 October 1927) is a Swiss francophone comics creator. He is probably best known for his western children's comics series Yakari, of which he has written the scripts from 1973 until 2016.

Biography
André Jobin was born in Delémont, Switzerland. He became a journalist and founded Le Crapaud à lunettes in 1964, a magazine for children.

In 1967, he met Derib and hired him. In 1967 they published The Adventures of the Owl Pythagore together.

In 1969, he created the series Yakari, drawn by Derib.

In 1991, he was awarded with the Masters of Honor at the  Sierre Comics Festival for his career.

In 2016 wrote his last story about Yakari. Joris Chamblain will now continue with Derib.

Series
 The Adventures of the Owl Pythagore (3 albums)
 Yakari (39 albums) (1973-2016)

References

 

1927 births
Living people
Swiss comics writers
Swiss writers in French